Weaver Lake also called Weavers Lake is a lake located in The town of Warren in Herkimer County, New York. Maumee Swamp is located north of and drains into Weaver Lake. Weaver Lake is north of and drains into Young Lake. Weaver and Young Lakes are collectively known as either "Waiontha Lakes" or "the Little Lakes". Waiontha Mountain, located southwest was named after the Waiontha Lakes.

Fishing

Fish species present in the lake are black crappie, brown bullhead, chain pickerel, golden shiner, largemouth bass, pumpkinseed sunfish, rock bass, white sucker, and yellow perch. There is a New York State Department of Environmental Conservation (NYSDEC) hand launch west of the hamlet of Warren on US 20, and only electric motors are allowed.

References

Lakes of New York (state)
Lakes of Herkimer County, New York